During the 2006–07 English football season, Crystal Palace competed in the Football League Championship.

Season summary
Peter Taylor took the job at Crystal Palace after Hull City paid a compensation package of £300,000 to chairman Simon Jordan. For this Jordan received praise from Hull chairman Adam Pearson for his conduct in the process of appointing Taylor.

Most Palace fans were very pleased with this appointment, and were looking forward to an exciting 2006–07 season.

Taylor made a whole host of summer signings, and despite a superb start which saw Palace at the top of the table after three games, a terrible run of form saw the Eagles slip down the order, falling to 20th at one stage. Despite this, Jordan was content to leave Taylor in charge of first-team affairs, and his faith was rewarded as Palace picked up their form in the post-Christmas period.

After being unbeaten in eight games, the Eagles finally disappointingly lost to Dennis Wise's struggling Leeds United side. Controversy followed the game as Wise revealed an unnamed Leeds player had shared information about the Leeds teamsheet to Taylor's side before the game. Many Palace and Leeds fans believed that former Eagle Shaun Derry might have been the player who shared the information, and though Derry's agent played down these reports, it is notable that Derry rejoined Palace in the following season.

After a season of ups and downs, Palace eventually finished in 12th position.

In June 2007 Jordan succeeded in his High Court battle against Coventry City boss Iain Dowie, with The Hon. Mr Justice Tugendhat ruling that Dowie had lied when negotiating his way out of his contract at Palace. Dowie won the right to appeal and thus the case dragged on, finally being settled out of court the following April for an unknown fee.

Final league table

Results
Crystal Palace's score comes first

Legend

Football League Championship

FA Cup

League Cup

Players

First-team squad
Squad at end of season

Left club during season

Transfers

In
  Leon Cort-  Hull City, 30 June 2006, £1.000.000
  Mark Kennedy –  Wolverhampton Wanderers, 11 July 2006, free
  Scott Flinders –  Barnsley
  James Scowcroft –  Coventry City, 29 July 2006, £500,000
  Carl Fletcher –  West Ham United, £400,000
  Matthew Lawrence –  Millwall, 2 August 2006, undisclosed
  Stuart Green –  Hull City, £75,000
  Shefki Kuqi –  Blackburn Rovers, £2,500,000
  Paul Ifill –  Sheffield United, £750,000
  Dave Martin –  Dartford, £25,000

Out
  Andrew Johnson-  Everton, 30 May 2006, £8.600.000
  Fitz Hall-  Wigan Athletic, 26 June 2006, £3.000.000
  Mikele Leigertwood –  Sheffield United, 4 July 2006, £600,000
  Sam Togwell –  Barnsley
  Tony Popovic –  Al-Arabi, 19 July 2006, free
  Glenn Wilson –  Rushden & Diamonds, free
  Emmerson Boyce –  Wigan Athletic, 1 August 2006, £1,000,000
  Nathan Simpson –  Torquay United, free
  Marco Reich –  Kickers Offenbach, free

References

Notes

2006-07
Crystal Palace